Conrad John Schuck Jr. (born February 4, 1940) is an American film, stage and television actor. He is best known for his role as Sgt. Charles Enright in the 1970s crime drama McMillan & Wife. He also played Herman Munster in the late-1980s/early 1990s sitcom The Munsters Today, playing the role originated by Fred Gwynne in the 1960s sitcom The Munsters.

Schuck is also known for his work on Star Trek, often playing Klingon characters, as well as his recurring roles as Draal on Babylon 5 and as Chief of Detectives Muldrew of the New York City Police Department in Law & Order.

Life and career
Schuck was born in Boston, Massachusetts to Mary (née Hamilton) and Conrad John Schuck, a professor at SUNY Buffalo. He is of English and German descent.

He made his first theatrical appearances at Denison University, and after graduating continued his career at the Cleveland Play House, Baltimore's Center Stage, and finally the American Conservatory Theater, where he was discovered by Robert Altman.

His first film appearance was as Capt. Walter Kosciuszko "Painless Pole" Waldowski in M*A*S*H (1970). As Painless, Schuck holds a place in Hollywood history as the first person to say "fuck" in a major studio film. He went on to appear in several more Altman films: Brewster McCloud (1970), McCabe & Mrs. Miller (1971), and Thieves Like Us (1974).

In 1970 he appeared as insurance salesman and former Minnesota Vikings lineman Frank Carelli in Episode 5 of the first season of The Mary Tyler Moore Show, "Keep Your Guard Up."

From 1971 to 1977, Schuck appeared as San Francisco Police Detective Sergeant Charles Enright in the television series McMillan & Wife and also starred as an overseer in the miniseries Roots. In 1976, he played Gregory "Yoyo" Yoyonovich in the short-lived series Holmes & Yoyo; both it and McMillan & Wife were created and produced by Leonard B. Stern for what is now NBCUniversal Television. Schuck starred in ABC's 1979 TV holiday special The Halloween That Almost Wasn't as the Frankenstein Monster. (He would again use the Universal International Frankenstein-monster makeup format in The Munsters Today; see below.) In 1979 he starred in a short-lived TV series version of Turnabout, where he and Sharon Gless played Sam and Penny, a couple who trade bodies. Some installments from that comedy series were reedited into the made-for-TV film Magic Statue, named for the artifact that caused the body-swap. 

In the 1970s–80s, Schuck was also a regular "guest celebrity" on game shows such as Pyramid, Hollywood Squares, Password Plus and Super Password and The Cross-Wits. During this period, he made his Broadway debut playing Oliver "Daddy" Warbucks as a replacement in the role of the original Broadway musical comedy Annie at the Alvin Theatre, for a special three-week engagement. In 1980, he began appearing as a "regular replacement" for a year and a half, along with Allison Smith as Annie and Alice Ghostley as Miss Hannigan.

Later work
In 1986, Schuck took the role of Klingon ambassador Kamarag in Star Trek IV: The Voyage Home. He reprised the role in 1991 in Star Trek VI: The Undiscovered Country.

Also in the 1980s, Schuck starred as Herman Munster in the syndicated situation comedy The Munsters Today, co-starring Lee Meriwether as Lily Munster. In character as Herman, a role Fred Gwynne originated in the 1960s, Schuck was made up as the Frankenstein Monster, according to the makeup format whose copyright NBCUniversal still owns, for the second time in his career; the first (see above) was in The Halloween That Almost Wasn't.

He guest starred in Star Trek: Deep Space Nine as Legate Parn, Star Trek: Voyager as Chorus #3, Star Trek: Enterprise as Antaak, and Babylon 5 as Draal in "The Long, Twilight Struggle" (1995). In 1994, he appeared as Ralgha nar Hhallas (callsign Hobbes) in Wing Commander III: Heart of the Tiger.  He then guest-starred in several episodes of Law & Order: Special Victims Unit as the NYPD Chief of Detectives Muldrew.

Under his full name of "Conrad John Schuck," he opened in the role of Daddy Warbucks in the Broadway revival of Annie in December 2006, and toured nationally in the role. He later appeared in the films Holy Matrimony and String of the Kite.

In 2013, he appeared as Senator Max Evergreen in Nice Work If You Can Get It. Most recently, Schuck joined the cast of writer/director Chris Blake's (a.k.a. Christopher Blake Johnson) indie horror film, All Light Will End.

Personal life
Schuck married actress Susan Bay, with whom he had a son, Aaron Bay-Schuck. The couple divorced in 1983. He married his current wife, painter Harrison Houlé, in 1990.

Filmography
 1970 MASH as Captain "Painless Pole" Waldowski
 1970 The Moonshine War as E.J. Royce
 1970 Brewster McCloud as Officer Johnson
 1971 McCabe & Mrs. Miller as Smalley
 1972 Hammersmith Is Out as Henry Joe
 1973 Blade as Reardon
 1974 Thieves Like Us as Chicamaw
 1979 Turnabout (TV Series) as Sam Alston/Penny Alston
 1979 Butch and Sundance: The Early Days as "Kid" Curry / Harvey Logan
 1979 Just You and Me, Kid as Stan
 1981 Earthbound as Sheriff De Rita
 1984 Finders Keepers as Police Chief Norris
 1986 Star Trek IV: The Voyage Home as Klingon Ambassador
 1987 Outrageous Fortune as Agent Atkins
 1988 The New Adventures of Pippi Longstocking as Captain Efraim Longstocking
 1989 My Mom's a Werewolf as Howard Shaber
 1989 Second Sight as Lieutenant "Noogie" Manoogian
 1990 Dick Tracy as Reporter
 1991 Star Trek VI: The Undiscovered Country as Klingon Ambassador
 1994 Holy Matrimony as Markowski
 1994 Pontiac Moon as Officer
 1995 Freakazoid! as Arms Akimbo (voice)
 1995 Demon Knight as Sheriff Tupper
 2001 The Curse of the Jade Scorpion as Mize
 2014 Closer to God as Sydney
 2018 All Light Will End as Psychiatrist

References

External links
 
 
 
 

1940 births
American people of English descent
American people of German descent
American male film actors
American male stage actors
American male television actors
Denison University alumni
Living people
Male actors from Boston
Singers from Massachusetts
American Conservatory Theater alumni